Interstate 65 (I-65) is a major north–south Interstate Highway in the central United States. As with most primary Interstates ending in 5, it is a major crosscountry, north–south route, connecting between the Great Lakes and the Gulf of Mexico. Its southern terminus is located at an interchange with I-10 in Mobile, Alabama, and its northern terminus is at an interchange with I-90, U.S. Route 12 (US 12), and US 20 (the Dunes Highway) in Gary, Indiana, just southeast of Chicago. I-65 connects several major metropolitan areas in the Midwest and Southern US. It connects the four largest cities in Alabama: Mobile, Montgomery, Birmingham, and Huntsville. It also serves as one of the main north–south routes through Nashville, Tennessee; Louisville, Kentucky; and Indianapolis, Indiana, each a major metropolitan area in its respective state.

Route description 

|-
| AL
| 366.22
| 590.63
|-
| TN
| 121.71
| 195.87
|-
| KY
| 137.32
| 221.00
|-
| IN
| 261.27
| 420.47
|-
| Total
| 887.30
| 1427.97
|}

Alabama 

In the state of Alabama, I-65 passes through or near four of the state's major metropolitan areas: Mobile, Montgomery, Birmingham, and Huntsville. I-65 begins its path northward in Mobile at its junction with I-10. From I-10, I-65 runs west of downtown Mobile and through the northern suburbs of the city before turning northeasterly towards Montgomery. In Montgomery, I-65 connects with the southern terminus of I-85. In the Birmingham suburbs, I-65 has an interchange with I-459 and another interchange in the city at I-20/I-59. North of downtown, I-22 branches off I-65 toward Memphis. From Birmingham, I-65 continues north, crossing the Tennessee River near Decatur. A few miles north of the river, it intersects I-565, a short spur route which provides access to Huntsville. It then continues northward out of the Tennessee Valley to the state of Tennessee toward Nashville.

Tennessee 

It then passes Lewisburg. Then it passes close to Columbia and crosses Saturn Parkway, which brings travelers to the town of Spring Hill. I-65 then continues on to reach I-840 and progresses until it intersects State Route 96 (SR 96) at Franklin. Then the highway goes through Brentwood, Nashville, Madison, Goodlettsville, White House, and then, close to Portland, it crosses into the state of Kentucky at milepost 120.5.

Kentucky 

Throughout its length, it passes near Mammoth Cave National Park, Bernheim Arboretum and Research Forest, the National Corvette Museum, and Fort Knox.

The first major intersection in the state is with I-165 (former Natcher Parkway) at Bowling Green. I-65 has intersections with three of the parkways in the state. The first major junction is with the Cumberland Parkway near Rocky Hill. At Elizabethtown, it has two more parkway interchanges with the Wendell H. Ford Western Kentucky Parkway and the Martha Layne Collins Bluegrass Parkway. I-65 also has interchanges with I-265, I-264, I-64, and I-71.

The widest stretch of I-65 in its entirety is in Louisville at Kentucky Route 1065 (KY 1065, Outer Loop), where the main line is 14 lanes wide. The highway crosses the Ohio River into Indiana on a toll bridge. The southbound side is called the John F. Kennedy Memorial Bridge (southbound) and the northbound side is called the Abraham Lincoln Bridge. The latter bridge opened in October 2016 as part of the Ohio River Bridges Project. Prior to the project, the John F. Kennedy Memorial Bridge (completed in 1963) carried traffic in both directions. The project also included reconstruction of the I-65/I-64/I-71 convergence interchange just south of the Kennedy Bridge, as well as renovating the older span to carry six lanes of southbound traffic.

At one time, the  stretch of I-65 from Louisville to Elizabethtown was a toll road, called the Kentucky Turnpike. The bonds that financed the road have been paid off, and tolls are no longer collected. All signs of the former turnpike have been removed.

On November 15, 2006, the stretch of I-65 from Bowling Green to Louisville was renamed the Abraham Lincoln Memorial Expressway.

On February 12, 2007, a bill passed the Kentucky Senate to rename I-65 in Jefferson County the Dr. Martin Luther King Jr. Expressway. Signs were posted July 25, 2007.

Indiana 

I-65 enters Indiana at Jeffersonville and Clarksville. Miles 0–9 were rebuilt, widened, and realigned from north of Sellersburg to the Ohio River during 2008–2010, giving great traffic relief to the fast-growing Indiana suburbs of Louisville. Over 300,000 of the 1.5 million people in Louisville's CMSA live in its Indiana counties.

A section of I-65 in Downtown Indianapolis runs concurrently with I-70. The junctions are often referred to as the "North Split" and the "South Split", forming a section of Interstate locally known as the "Inner Loop" or "The Spaghetti Bowl" due to the visual complexity of the intersecting ramps and overpasses.

In mid-March 2007, a  section of I-70 from the North Split to I-465 east of downtown was restricted to automobiles only for the "Super 70" project, a massive rebuild and expansion of that freeway. Westbound traffic from I-70 was required to loop north or south along I-465 to get to I-65 or I-70. The Super 70 project was completed in November 2007.

In mid-2003, the portion of I-65 that runs concurrently with I-70 was closed to all traffic due to the "HyperFix" project. During that time, a new concrete surface was installed and the overpasses were upgraded.

In 1999, the  segment of I-65 between the two I-465 interchanges was renamed the Kenneth "Babyface" Edmonds Highway.

North of Lafayette near Brookston, the road passes through the Meadow Lake Wind Farm for several miles, with the turbines and standards spaced out in order to avoid a collapse onto the highway. The Fowler Ridge Wind Farm is also visible on both sides of the highway.

From its crossing into Lake County over the Kankakee River to its northern terminus, the highway is known as the Casimir Pulaski Memorial Highway.

Traffic going from I-90 to I-65 had to stop at a traffic signal to make a left turn. Traffic from I-65 to I-90 bypassed the traffic signal via an isolated right-turn lane. In 2004, the interchange was fully grade-separated, so it is now one interchange involving I-65, I-90, US 12, and US 20, thereby eliminating a connection gap in the Interstate Highway System.

History

Junction list
Alabama
  in Mobile
  in Mobile
  in Mobile
  in Prichard
  in Prichard
  north-northeast of Satsuma
  west-southwest of Evergreen
  on the Hope Hull–Montgomery line
  in Montgomery. The highways travel concurrently through Montgomery.
  in Montgomery. I-65/US 82 travels concurrently to Prattville.
  in Montgomery
  north of Prattville
  in Clanton
  in Calera
  in Alabaster
  in Hoover
  on the Hoover–Vestavia Hills city line
  in Birmingham
  in Birmingham
  in Birmingham
  in Fultondale
  in Smoke Rise. The highways travel concurrently through Smoke Rise.
  in Cullman
  south-southeast of Lacon
  on the Decatur–Huntsville city line
  in Athens
  in Athens. The highways travel concurrently to Ardmore, Tennessee.
Tennessee
  west of Frankewing
  in Columbia
  in Nashville
  in Nashville. The highways travel concurrently through Nashville.
  in Nashville
  in Nashville
  in Nashville. The highways travel concurrently through Nashville.
  in Nashville
  in Nashville
  in Goodlettsville
Kentucky
  south-southeast of Franklin
  in Bowling Green
  in Bowling Green
  in Oakland
  in Munfordville
  in Elizabethtown
  in Elizabethtown
  in Louisville
  in Louisville
  in Louisville
  /  in Louisville
Indiana
  in Jeffersonville. The highways travel concurrently to west of Jeffersonville.
  in Clarksville
  south-southeast of Crothersville
  in Seymour
  in Taylorsville
  in Indianapolis
  in Indianapolis. The highways travel concurrently through Indianapolis.
  in Indianapolis
  north-northwest of Royalton. I-65/US 52 travels concurrently to Lebanon.
  south of Wolcott
  east of Remington
  north of Remington
  in Crown Point
  in Merrillville
  in Gary
  in Gary
  in Gary
Reference:

Auxiliary routes 

, serving the Alabama communities of Prichard and Mobile.
, a spur in Alabama that begins in Decatur and ends in Huntsville.
, a spur in Kentucky that begins in Bowling Green and ends in Owensboro.
, the beltway around the Louisville area in Kentucky and Indiana. In Kentucky, the highway is called the Gene Snyder freeway in Kentucky, and the Lee H. Hamilton Highway in Indiana between I-65 and the Lewis and Clark Bridge connecting Indiana and Kentucky on the eastern side of Louisville..
, a full beltway around Indianapolis.
, a connection between I-65 and I-465 on the northwest side of Indianapolis, formerly numbered I-465.

See also 

 Ohio River Bridges Project
 Super Bowl XLI, dubbed the "I-65 Bowl" due to the proximity of the competing teams' cities (Indianapolis and Chicago) to I-65

References

External links 

 

 
65
U.S. Route 31